Shahid Bahonar University of Kerman (SBUK) is a research institution and university of engineering and science in Iran, which offers both undergraduate and postgraduate studies. Located in the Kerman province of Iran, the university is among the top ten universities and research institutes in Iran, illustrating its high status in research and education. The Shahid Bahonar University of Kerman occupies an area of 5 million square meters, making it one of the largest universities in Iran and the region. The university has two major campuses in the city of Kerman and several smaller campuses spread out across the province of Kerman, offering degrees in over 100 different specialties leading to B.A., B.Sc., M.A., M.Sc., D.V.M., or Ph.D degrees. Although there have been some moves by the smaller campuses in the province to become independent universities, there are still strong ties between these newly established universities and The Shahid Bahonar University of Kerman.
The college of art and architecture, the Saba Faculty of Art and Architecture, was named after Afzalipour's wife.
The Shahid Bahonar University of Kerman was appointed as the Center of Excellence (fa:قطب علمی) by Iran's Ministry of Science and Technology (Higher Education) in the field of mathematics. In 1980 the Department of Mathematics was awarded the first doctoral degree in mathematics in all of Iran. Moreover, the second and third doctoral candidates in mathematics awarded in the country were also graduates of this department.

History 

The university was started by Alireza Afzalipour on August 9, 1972, and inaugurated in 1985. Before the 1979 Islamic Revolution in Iran, this university was called the University of Kerman, and it included the college of medicine. After the revolution, the name was changed to the Shahid Bahonar University of Kerman, and the college of medicine was established as an independent university which is now called the Kerman University of Medical Sciences.

Founder
The Shahid Bahonar University of Kerman was founded by a businessman named Alireza Afzalipour and his wife Fakhereh Saba. Afzalipour had toured several cities in Iran to choose a site for the construction of a university. He finally decided to build his university in the city of Kerman. The University of Kerman was the first university in the whole province of Kerman. In 2010, celebrations were held at the Shahid Bahonar University of Kerman to mark his 100th birthday anniversary.

Previous and current name
Before the Islamic Revolution of 1979, the university was known as the University of Kerman. It was later changed to the name of Shahid Bahonar University to honour the name of Mr Bahonar. Hojatoleslam Mohammad Javad Bahonar (Persian: محمدجواد باهنر, 5 September 1933 – 30 August 1981) was an Iranian scholar, Shiite theologian and politician who served as the Prime minister of Iran from 15 to 30 August 1981 when he was assassinated by Mujahideen-e Khalq MEK, also known as PMOI and KMO. He is the first Iranian cleric Prime Minister.

Campuses 
The university has two major campuses. One is the Afzalipour Campus which is located in the southern part of Kerman City and is considered the main campus. The Afzalipour Campus includes faculty buildings, research centres, the main library, residential halls, the mosque, administrative buildings, and several sports venues.
The other main campus is the Campus of Technology and Engineering located in the western part of Kerman City. The university also has several satellite campuses in the Province of Kerman. The Sirjan Campus started accepting graduate-level students in 2012 and planned to make the campus international. There are also some plans to open an international campus in the island of Qeshm in the Persian Gulf.

Faculties and colleges 
Colleges bring together academics and students from a broad range of disciplines, and within each faculty or department within the university, academics from many different colleges can be found.

 College of Engineering
 Department of Industrial Engineering
 Department of Mechanical Engineering
 Department of Civil Engineering
 Department of Electrical Engineering
 Department of Computer Engineering
 Department of Mining Engineering
 Department of Chemical Engineering
 Department of Metallurgy Engineering
 Department of Petroleum Engineering
 College of Management and Economics
 Department of Management
 Department of Economics
 Department of Accounting
 College of Veterinary Medicine
 Department of Basic Sciences
 Department of Clinical Studies
 Department of Food Hygiene & Public Health
 Department of Pathobiology
 College of Agriculture
 Department of Irrigation and Water Engineering
 Department of Food Processing Engineering
 Department of Biotechnological Engineering
 Department of Agricultural Machinery
 Department of Agricultural Economics
 Department of Soil Engineering
 Department of Plant Protection
 Department of Plant Breeding
 College of Art and Architecture
 Department of Architecture
 Department of Traditional and Ancient Arts
 Department of Painting
 Department of Carpet Studies
 Department of Restoration of Historic Buildings
 College of Mathematics
 Department of Mathematics
 Department of Statistics
 Department of Computer Sciences
 College of Literature and Social Sciences
 Department of Foreign Languages
 Department of Persian Language and Literature
 Department of Psychology
 Department of Social Sciences
 Department of Geography and Urban Planning
 Department of Islamic Studies
 Department of Political Studies
 Department of History
 Department of Library Sciences
 College of Physics
 College of Geology
 College of Sciences
 Department of Biology
 Department of Chemistry
 College of Sports and Athletics

Satellite Colleges and Campuses 
 College of Agriculture in the city of Jiroft
 Department of Agricultural Machinery
 Department of Animal Production Technology
 Department of Plant Production Technology
 College of Technology in the city of Sirjan
 Department of Civil Engineering
 Department of Mechanical Engineering
 College of Mining in the city of Zarand
 Department of Mining

Research institutes and centers 
 Research and Technology Institute of Plant Production(RTIPP)
 The Research Center for Mining Industry
 The Research Center for Islamic and Iranian Culture
 The Research Center for Energy and the Environment
 The Mathematical Research Center of Mahani
 The Research Group for Women and Family Issues
 The Research Group for Molecular Biotechnology
Kashigar Geomechanics Research Center (KGMC)

Library 
The Shahid Bahonar University of Kerman features several Libraries. There is one main library and each college has a separate library of its own. The main library of the university is called the Central Library and Documentation Center. All the libraries, including the Central Library and Documentation Center of different colleges of the university are members of the Ghadir program for libraries of Iranian universities and higher educational institutes.

Facilities 
Sport venues

The Shahid Bahonar University of Kerman has different sport venues and maintains a long-standing tradition of student participation in sport and recreation.
The main sports complex of the university consists of several basketball, volleyball and tennis courts and a 5000 spectator football stadium.

 Dormitory

There is a large dormitory complex which houses many students, although there are still some students who need to be housed outside of the university in private dorms.

 Restaurants

Students have the option to either subscribe to the university meal plan, which offers subsidized meals at the university's self-service restaurant or dine at the other on-campus restaurants and cafe-shops available.

Research and innovation 
The Shahid Bahonar University of Kerman has strong ties with industries - especially those located in the Province of Kerman, which has brought many funding and financing opportunities for the University. Since the Shahid Bahonar University of Kerman is a state university, research funds are provided by the Government of Iran. Many ISI journal papers and conference papers are published regularly by faculties, researchers and students of the Shahid Bahonar University of Kerman.

Endowment 
The Shahid Bahonar University of Kerman is a public university and its funding is provided by the government of Iran. For the top ranks of the national university entrance exam, education is free in all state-owned and public universities.  Students with ranks below the normal capacity of the universities will be required to pay part or all of the tuition.

Language of instruction 
Although the official language of instruction in the Shahid Bahonar University of Kerman is Persian, a large number of lecture materials, reference books, homework assignments, and even exams are in English. This is especially true for the postgraduate students who are encouraged to use English textbooks and materials as their main references.

Academic year 
The academic year is divided into three academic terms, determined by the university. The first academic term usually starts on the 23rd of September. The second Academic term usually starts on the 11th of February, and the Summer term usually starts from the 10th of July.

Publishing 
The University's publishing arm, the Shahid Bahonar University of Kerman Press, has published many different academic books and journals.

Architecture 
The two major campuses of the university have different styles of architecture. The Shahid Bahonar University of Kerman - the Afzalipour Campus has a modernist style of architecture inspired by the vernacular architecture of the region. The architecture of this university is very distinct in that almost all of the colleges are connected.  All of the colleges have a similar style of architecture.

Afzalipour assigned Bonyan Consulting Company to prepare a campus master plan and design the buildings of the university Master plan and design concepts were developed to tackle the problem of uncertainty. It was set as a primary goal to have a flexible design both inside the buildings and in their inter-connections. In each stage of development, the campus was to be a complete and coherent whole, still allowing for future expansion without hindering the functioning departments.

The master plan was inspired by the organic urban grid of Kerman city centre that has historically evolved in response to climatic conditions of a desert town. The height of the main building blocks are restricted to 3, optimizing seismological, climatic, economic and circulation considerations. Interconnection of the blocks on the upper stories integrates educational and research spaces, thus enhancing flexibility. These also provide shadow and shelter for open pathways under-passing below. Careful distancing of blocks, along with articulate projections of the buildings, allow natural and controlled lighting for inner spaces while creating ample shadow for the inner courtyards. This general arrangement, permits one to cross the whole campus through courtyards and archways with minimal detours, under protection from direct sunlight or rain if needed, or to access other departments from within the buildings and through connecting corridors and internal patios.
Currently, two new colleges are being built, an extension to the college of Agriculture, which connects the Saba Faculty of Art and Architecture to the rest of colleges at the campus and also the new college of Management and Economics, which is connected to the rest of colleges via the newly built College of Geology. The Campus of Technology and Engineering has also a unique style of architecture but very different from the style of the Afzalipour Campus.

International study and exchange 
The Office of International Exchange Programs was established to provide students and faculty with exchange opportunities, including sending and hosting visiting scholars, aiding faculty members in arranging international study tours, developing exchange agreements with universities around the world.

Student organisations 
There are several student organizations active throughout the university. Most of these organizations are only concentrated on academic activities with some also interested and active in political issues.

Notable alumni 
 Eshaq Jahangiri, first vice president of Hassan Rouhani's government
 Majid Namjoo, Iranian Minister of Energy
 Omid Tabibzadeh, Iranian linguist
 Mohammad Mehdi Zahedi, former Iranian Minister of Science, Research and Technology
 Hessam Yazdani, professor of civil engineering, Howard University, Washington, D.C., USA

See also 
 Education in Iran
 Higher education in Iran
 Alireza Afzalipour
 Fakhereh Saba
 National Library of Iran
 List of Iranian Research Centers
 List of Iranian scientists from the pre-modern era
 Modern Iranian scientists and engineers

References

External links 

Official website of Research Deputy
Official website of Studies Deputy
Official website of Developments Deputy
Official website of Students affairs Deputy
Portal for the students of College of Literature and Social Sciences
Official website of Shahid Bahonar University of Kerman at the Ministry of Higher Education - Center for Cultural Affairs

 
Educational institutions established in 1972
Education in Kerman Province
Buildings and structures in Kerman Province